The 2015 IIHF World Championship Division III was an international ice hockey tournament run by the International Ice Hockey Federation. It was contested in İzmir, Turkey, from 3 to 12 April 2015. Seven nations participated, including Bosnia and Herzegovina, who joined the world championships for the first time since 2008. After three consecutive years of finishing in the second place, North Korea won the tournament and was promoted to Division II Group B for 2016.

Divisional tournaments are designed, by the rules, to include six teams, however the Bosnian federation asked to be included and the Turkish organizers agreed. Georgia recorded their first victory, defeating Bosnia and Herzegovina 4–1.

Venue

Participants

Match officials
4 referees and 7 linesmen were selected for the tournament.

Referees
 Geoffrey Barcelo
 Feng Lei
 Gergely Kincses
 Sergei Sobolev

Linesmen
 Murat Aygün
 Anton Gladchenko
 Cemal Ersin Kaya
 Grega Markizeti
 Gil Haim Tichon
 Mihai Ariel Trandafir
 Vladimir Yefremov

Standings

Results
All times are local (UTC+3).

Awards and statistics

Awards
Best players selected by the directorate:
 Best Goaltender:  Andrei Ilienko
 Best Defenceman:  Ri Pong-il
 Best Forward:  Alec Koçoğlu
Source: IIHF.com

Scoring leaders

List shows the top skaters sorted by points, then goals.

GP = Games played; G = Goals; A = Assists; Pts = Points; +/− = Plus/minus; PIM = Penalties in minutesSource: IIHF.com

Goaltending leaders
(minimum 40% team's total ice time)

TOI = Time on Ice (minutes:seconds); SA = Shots against; GA = Goals against; GAA = Goals against average; Sv% = Save percentage; SO = ShutoutsSource: IIHF.com

References

External links
IIHF website

2015
4
2015
2015 IIHF World Championship Division III
World
2010s in İzmir